Tahoua II is an urban commune in Niger. It is a commune of the city of Tahoua.

References

Communes of Niger